Bartoszówek  is a village in the administrative district of Gmina Strzegom, within Świdnica County, Lower Silesian Voivodeship, in south-western Poland. Prior to 1945 it was in Germany.

Notable residents
 Manfred von Richthofen (1855-1939), General of Cavalry
 Wolfram Freiherr von Richthofen (1895-1945), Fieldmarshal
 Walter von Wietersheim (1917-2002), officer

References

Villages in Świdnica County